Skyhawk Baseball Field is a baseball venue in Martin, Tennessee, United States.  It is home to the UT Martin Skyhawks baseball team of the  Division I Ohio Valley Conference.  Built in 1974, the venue was renovated in 2005 and 2008.  In 2005, a deck viewing area located down the first base line was added.  In 2008, seating areas were improved and a new scoreboard was added.  The field also features stadium lighting.  The Skyhawk Baseball/Softball Building sits adjacent to Skyhawk Park and includes offices and clubhouses for both programs.

See also 
 List of NCAA Division I baseball venues

References 

College baseball venues in the United States
Baseball venues in Tennessee
UT Martin Skyhawks baseball